The Crime of Cuenca is a Spanish drama film (made in 1980), directed by Pilar Miró and based on a miscarriage of justice, known as the Crime of Cuenca, which took place in the early 20th century in the Spanish province of Cuenca. El Crimen de Cuenca is the title of a book published at the same time by the author of the movie script, (Lola) Salvador Maldonado, in which she recounts the same facts. The film was entered into the 30th Berlin International Film Festival. The film was the highest-grossing Spanish film in Spain with a gross of 460 million pesetas, a record it held until surpassed by Los santos inocentes (1984).

Historical facts
On 21 August 1910, in the small town of Osa de la Vega, in the province of Cuenca, José María Grimaldos, known as "El Cepa" (the stump), is seen on the road to the nearby village of Tresjuncos and then disappears.

His family fears foul play and reports it to the Guardia Civil (rural police).  In the subsequent judicial investigation the family and others express their suspicions that two men, Gregorio Valero and León Sánchez had killed him for his money.  This first case was closed in September 1911 with no convictions.

In 1913 a new, young and overzealous judge named Isasa arrives. Influenced by the local boss, Judge Isasa decides to reopen the case. The two suspects are arrested by the Guardia Civil and under torture, confess to having killed the man and destroyed the body.  The fiscal (district attorney) asks for the death penalty for both.  Finally, on 25 May 1918 a popular jury convicted the two men of murder and they are sentenced to 18 years in prison.  After serving eleven years, they are released under a general pardon on 20 February 1924.

Two years later, in early 1926, it is discovered by chance that the reputed victim, Grimaldos, "El Cepa", was alive and had been living in a nearby town.  The ugly truth is thus revealed and the innocence of the convicted men becomes evident.

With many legal difficulties, the case is reopened and eventually reached the Supreme Court, where the convictions were overturned.

The film
Based on these facts, writer Ramón J. Sender, wrote the novel El lugar de un hombre (The Place of a Man) in 1939 and later, in 1979, Pilar Miró directed the movie based on the story while Salvador Maldonado published her book.

The movie is an attack against torture and it is understood that the crime in the title is committed by the Guardia Civil in torturing the suspects.

The torture scenes are depicted in great detail and crudity and the movie was initially banned in Spain and the director subjected to military courts martial. Only in August 1981 was the film allowed to be shown in Spain where it was a box office success.

Cast

See also 
Crime of Cuenca

References

External links 
 

1980 films
1980s Spanish-language films
1980 crime drama films
Spanish crime drama films
Drama films based on actual events
Films about miscarriage of justice
Films directed by Pilar Miró
Films set in Spain
Films shot in the province of Cuenca